Kalyana Sowgandhikam is a 1996 Indian Malayalam-language comedy drama film directed by Vinayan and starring Dileep and Divya Unni. It is the debut movie of Divya Unni as a lead actress.

Plot
Jayadeva Sharma hails from an aristocratic Brahmin family. However his family's fortunes disappear as his parents die and he is fostered by a goldsmith. Eventually he is betrayed by his friend Ananthapadmanabhan, a man who he thinks is Aathira's boyfriend. To get his money back, he disguises as a sage with the help of his friends Hariprasad, Bahuleyan and Premadasan and gets into the house of Aathira's grandfather, Kunnamanagalam Neelakantan Vaidyar as a guest.

Jayadevan's and Aathira's friendship blooms after he saves her from Balagopalan, who is a cousin of her. Premadasan end up falling in love with Vasumathi who is also a cousin of Aathira. Near the climax on Aathira's wedding day, Jayadevan is held hostage by Ananthapadmanabhan and is saved by Premadasan. At the end Aathira's fiancé is caught and Aathira and Jayadevan unites.

Cast
Dileep as Mullassery Manakkal Jayadeva Sharma / Jayadevananda Swamikal
Divya Unni as Athira
Jagadish as Premadasan
Jagathi Sreekumar as Mambally Vasudevan (voice by Ramesh Kurumassery)
Kalabhavan Mani as Balagopalan
Captain Raju as Kunnamangalam Neelakantan Vaidyar
Chippy as Vasumathi
K. P. A. C. Lalitha as Subhadra
Harisree Asokan as Bahuleyan
Indrans as Krishnankutty a.k.a. Shahanshah
Zainuddin as Hariprasad
Kamal Roy as Ananthapadmanabhan
Oduvil Unnikrishnan as Murukeshan Thattan
Shivaji as Bhargavan
 Sadiq as Raghavan
 Meena Ganesh as Murukeshan's Wife
 M. Renjith as Goonda

Soundtrack
"Gopala Hridayam Paadunna" - K. J. Yesudas

References

External links
 

1996 films
1990s Malayalam-language films
Films scored by Johnson
1996 romantic comedy films
Films directed by Vinayan
Indian romantic comedy films